Christian Hansen may refer to:

Christian Frederik Hansen (1756–1845), Danish architect
Christian Hansen (architect) (1803–1883), Danish architect
Christian Julius Hansen (1814–1875), Danish composer
Christian Hansen (gymnast) (1891–1961), Danish gymnast
Christian Hansen (politician) (born 1963), Danish politician
Christian Hansen (sailor) (born 1944), Danish Olympic sailor
C. X. Hansen (1869–1941), American educator and historian in the Lutheran church
Emil Christian Hansen (1842–1909), Danish physiologist
H. C. Hansen (1906–1960), Danish prime minister
Christian Hansen (general) (1885–1972), German World War II general
Christian Karsten Hansen (born 1966), Danish biotechnology entrepreneur and inventor
Christian Hansen Vennemoe (1812–1901), Norwegian politician
Christian Hansen Wollnick (1867–1936), Norwegian politician
Christian Frederik Hansen (officer) (1788–1873), Danish military officer and Minister of Defence
Christian Ulrik Hansen (1921–1944), member of the Danish resistance executed by the German occupying power
Christian Hansen (curler) (born 1976), Danish curler
Christian Hansen (rower) (1890–1953), Danish rower

See also
Kristian Hansen (disambiguation)
Christian Hanson (disambiguation)